Tony Duggan, (born 29 August 1978) is an Australian former professional rugby league footballer who last played for the Lézignan Sangliers in the Elite One Championship.

Celtic Crusaders
Duggan scored the first ever try for the club and is the club's record try scorer, with 101 over four seasons between 2006 and 2009, including a record 40 in the 2007 season . He was top scorer in the UK in both 2006 and 2007, and was awarded the 'League Weekly' newspaper's Try of the Season award in 2007. He now qualifies to play for Wales.

In August 2009, Duggan, along with five teammates, was ordered to leave the United Kingdom after the UK Border Agency identified breaches to their visa conditions. Celtic Crusaders cancelled Duggan's contract with immediate effect.

References

1978 births
Living people
Australian expatriate rugby league players
Australian expatriate sportspeople in France
Australian expatriate sportspeople in the United States
Australian expatriate sportspeople in Wales
Australian rugby league players
Brisbane Broncos players
Crusaders Rugby League players
Expatriate rugby league players in France
Expatriate rugby league players in the United States
Expatriate rugby league players in Wales
Lézignan Sangliers players
New Haven Warriors players
Place of birth missing (living people)
Rugby league fullbacks
Toowoomba Clydesdales players